The 2023 Mexico City ePrix known for sponsorships reasons as the 2023 Hankook Mexico City E-Prix was a Formula E electric car race held at the Autódromo Hermanos Rodríguez in the centre of Mexico City on 14 January 2023. It served as the opening round of the 2022–23 Formula E season and the seventh edition of the event.

Background
This was the first race of the 2022–23 Formula E season and as such was also the first Formula E race run with the Gen3 cars. This race was also the first to not feature Fanboost, which previously allowed for fans to vote for drivers to get an extra power boost. As well, this was the first race in which Hankook was the tyre provider for Formula E, after Michelin previously had served as the tyre provider.

Classification
(All times in CST)

Qualifying 
Qualifying took place at 9:40 AM on 14 January.

Qualifying duels

Overall classification

Race 
The race started at 2:03 PM on 14 January.

Notes:
  – Pole position.
  – Fastest lap.

Notes

References

|- style="text-align:center"
|width="35%"|Previous race:2022 Seoul ePrix
|width="30%"|FIA Formula E World Championship2022–23 season
|width="35%"|Next race:2023 Diriyah ePrix
|- style="text-align:center"
|width="35%"|Previous race:2022 Mexico City ePrix
|width="30%"|Mexico City ePrix
|width="35%"|Next race:2024 Mexico City ePrix
|- style="text-align:center"

2023
2022–23 Formula E season
2023 in Mexican motorsport
January 2023 sports events in North America